Stuart C. Davidson (September 9, 1922 – August 1, 2001) was an American businessman known for being the founder of the Clyde's of Georgetown restaurant in Georgetown, Washington, D.C. and the Clyde's Restaurant Group which owns and operates multiple restaurants in the Washington metropolitan area.

Biography
Davidson was born in Dayton, Ohio and grew up in Washington, D.C., graduating from St. Albans School. He attended Harvard College, with a two-year break during World War II when he served as a United States Army Air Forces pilot. He also earned a Master of Business Administration from Harvard Business School and worked as an investment banker for Kidder, Peabody & Co. and Wertheim & Co.

In 1963, Davidson opened Clyde's in Georgetown, shortly after the liquor laws in Washington, D.C. were loosened to permit service of hard liquor to patrons standing at bars. The restaurant was immediately profitable, and Davidson partnered with a former Clyde's dishwasher, John G. Laytham, to expand the business to Clyde's Restaurant Group, opening five more Clyde's restaurants, purchasing the Old Ebbitt Grill, and opening several more restaurants in the Washington metropolitan area.

Davidson died of complications from acute myeloid leukemia at a hospital in Oslo, Norway on August 1, 2001.

References

1922 births
2001 deaths
Businesspeople from Dayton, Ohio
Businesspeople from Washington, D.C.
Harvard College alumni
Harvard Business School alumni
American restaurateurs
St. Albans School (Washington, D.C.) alumni
20th-century American businesspeople